Efkan Ala (born 21 February 1965) is a Turkish politician and former civil servant who served as the Minister of the Interior from November 2015 to August 2016;. He  previously held the same post from 2013 to June 2015 despite not being a member of parliament at the time. He served as Governor of Batman from 2003 to 2004, as Governor of Diyarbakır from 2004 to 2007, and as Undersecretary to the Prime Minister from 2007 to 2013.

Early life
Ala was born in the township of Oltu in Erzurum Province in 1965. He studied Political Science at Istanbul University, graduating in 1987. He went to Torquay language school in England in 1989-1990.

Career

Civil service
In 1988, he began his civil service career as a district governor trainee. After working two years at the governor's office in Sakarya Province, and a one-year professional study in the United Kingdom, he became a district governor, and served two years in each townships of Dernekpazarı, Trabzon and Kabataş, Ordu. Ala was appointed Deputy Province Governor in Tunceli.

After serving at various positions in different ministries, he was made the Governor of Batman Province in 2003, where he served one year. On 14 September 2004, he was appointed as the Governor of Diyarbakır Province, remaining in that post until 2007.

On 10 September 2007, Ala became the Undersecretary to the Prime Minister.

Minister of the Interior

On 25 December 2013, Minister of the Interior Muammer Güler stepped down along with two of other cabinet members following a corruption investigation, which involved his son. The same day, Prime Minister Erdogan announced a cabinet reshuffle with ten new names. The next day, on 26 December, Efkan Ala assumed office as the Minister of the Interior as a non-member of the parliament, a move that was sharply criticized by some MPs of the prime minister's own AKP as well as by the leadership of the opposition CHP.

Ala resigned from the cabinet on 31 August 2016, having been criticised consistently by the opposition for failing to tackle growing terrorism by the Kurdistan Workers' Party (PKK), Islamic State of Iraq and the Levant (ISIL) and the Gülen movement (FETÖ). Attacks in Ankara, İstanbul and the south-east, as well as in the Syrian border provinces of Gaziantep and Kilis, had resulted in consistent calls for Ala's resignation, with criticism also being directed at how the Interior Ministry had appointed several Governors, police chiefs and bureaucrats throughout the country that were later identified to be supporters of FETÖ, the alleged organisation accused of staging a failed coup d'état attempt in July 2016. A reason for Ala's resignation was not given, though the main opposition Republican People's Party (CHP) claimed that Ala had been removed from office after the arrested Governor of Sinop and alleged FETÖ supporter had claimed he had close relations to Ala.

References

External links

1965 births
Living people
People from Oltu
Istanbul University alumni
Turkish civil servants
Governors of Batman
Governors of Diyarbakır
Ministers of the Interior of Turkey
Members of the 25th Parliament of Turkey
Members of the 26th Parliament of Turkey
Members of the 64th government of Turkey
Members of the 65th government of Turkey